Tribal may refer to:

Groups of people
 Tribe, a clan-based social structure
 Tribalism, strong cultural or ethnic identity that separates members of one group from another 
 Tribals or Adivasi, ethnic and tribal groups claimed to be the aboriginal population of India

Art and music
 Tribal art, visual arts and culture of indigenous peoples
 Tribal, a 2010 album released by Dr. John
 Tribal (album), a 2014 album by Imelda May
 "Tribal", a song by All Saints from Red Flag
 "Tribal", a song by P.O.D. from The Fundamental Elements of Southtown
 "Tribal", an instrumental song by Jeff Beck from "Live+" (2015)
 Tribal house, a subgenre of house music
 Tribal rhythms
 An alternate term for the music genre World music

Other uses
 Tribal colleges and universities in North America
 Tribal Gear, a Clothing and Accessories Company

See also
 Tribal class (disambiguation)
 Tribe (disambiguation)